Gylt (stylized as GYLT) is a survival horror video game developed and published by Tequila Works. It was released on November 19, 2019 for Google Stadia. It is notable for being one of the few Stadia-exclusive titles, causing it to be temporarily unavailable for sale upon that platform's shutdown in 2023. It is currently planned for a multiplatform re-release in 2023. GYLT received mixed reviews from critics, who called it enjoyable and praised the graphics, but said that it lacked excitement.

Plot 
The game's main character is Sally, a young girl who is trying to find her missing cousin, Emily. After school bullies cause her to crash her bike, she enters a nightmare world with dark parallels to her bullying.

Gameplay 
The gameplay revolves around sneaking past enemies while trying to escape the nightmare. Sally uses a flashlight as a weapon, although she later acquires a fire extinguisher as well. The game includes light elements of puzzles and combat.

Reception 

The game received an aggregate score of 68/100 on Metacritic, indicating "mixed or average" reviews.

Chris Carter of Destructoid rated the game 7/10 points, calling it short, but mostly engaging. He called the story a "slow burn", while comparing the stealth mechanic to Metal Gear Solid, and remarked that using the flashlight as a weapon was a "cool" way to avoid using guns. Chris Shive of Hardcore Gamer rated the game 3/5 points, calling it an "enjoyable" game with a "Silent Hill vibe", but not a killer app. He praised the "cartoonish" character designs and "unnerving" soundtrack.

Vikki Blake of Eurogamer called the game surprisingly scary for something she initially thought was made for kids, saying that the game ran well on Stadia besides one crash. However, she criticized the game as being "linear and predictable", with a "lazy, frustrating" final boss.

References 

2019 video games
Indie video games
Single-player video games
Stadia games
Survival horror video games
Video games about children
Video games developed in Spain
Video games featuring female protagonists